is a Buddhist temple in Nara, Japan. A number of wooden statues of the Heian and Kamakura periods have been designated Important Cultural Properties and the temple's five-coloured camellias are a Prefectural Natural Monument.

Name
The byakugō or urna is the curl of white hair between the eyebrows that is one of the thirty-two physical characteristics of the Buddha.

Buildings
The five by five bay Hondō, with tiled hipped roof, dates from the early Edo period (first half of the seventeenth century) and has been designated a Municipal Cultural Property. A tahōtō was still standing in the Meiji period.

Treasures

See also
 For an explanation of terms concerning Japanese Buddhism, Japanese Buddhist art, and Japanese Buddhist temple architecture, see the Glossary of Japanese Buddhism.

References

Buddhist temples in Nara, Nara
Shingon Ritsu temples